Cyamops nigeriensis is a species of fly.

References

nigeriensis
Insects described in 2000